An official residence is the residence of a head of state, head of government, governor, religious leader, leaders of international organizations, or other senior figure. It may be the same place where they conduct their work-related functions.

List of official residences, by country

Afghanistan
Arg (Cabinet)

Albania

 Prime Minister's Office
 Pallati i Brigadave
 Ish-Blloku (former residence of Enver Hoxha)

Algeria
 El Mouradia Presidential Palace

Angola
 Presidential Palace

Antigua and Barbuda
 Government House (Governor-General)

Argentina

 Casa Rosada (Presidential office)
 Quinta de Olivos (Presidential residence)
 Chapadmalal Residence (Summer House)

Armenia

 President's Residence
 Prime Minister's Residence
 Government House
 Prime Minister's Vacation House, in Sevan (President, retreat)

Australia

Federal
 Government House (Monarchy, Governor-General)
 Admiralty House (Monarchy, Governor-General, Sydney residence)
 The Lodge (Prime Minister)
 Kirribilli House (Prime Minister, Sydney residence)

State

 New South Wales:Government House (Governor)
 Queensland:Government House (Governor)
 South Australia:Government House (Governor)
 Tasmania:Government House (Governor)
 Victoria:Government House (Governor)
 Western Australia:Government House (Governor)

Territorial

Internal territory
 Northern Territory:Government House (Administrator)

External territories
 Christmas Island:Government House (Administrator)
 Cocos (Keeling) Islands:Government House (Administrator)
 Norfolk Island:Government House (Administrator)

State, former
 New South Wales Old Government House (Governor country residence at Parramatta (1790–1855) formerly) Hillview, (Governor summer residence at Sutton Forest (1882–1958), formerly) Cranbrook, Bellevue Hill, (Governor residence 1901–1917, formerly)
 Queensland Adelaide House, (Governor residence (1859–1862) formerly; now The Deanery of St. John's Anglican Cathedral Old Government House (Governor residence (1862–1909) formerly; kept as headquarters of the National Trust of Australia)
 South AustraliaOld Government House (Governor summer residence (1860–1880), formerly) Marble Hill (Governor summer residence (1880–1955), formerly; destroyed in the Black Sunday Bushfire of 1955)
 VictoriaLa Trobe's Cottage (Lieutenant Governor, residence (1840–1854) formerly; kept as museum)Toorak House (Governor residence (1854–1874), formerly; currently being used as a church) Bishopscourt (Governor residence (1874–1876), formerly) Stonnington Mansion (Governor residence (1901–1931) formerly; currently being restored as private home)
 Tasmania Old Government House (Governor's residence (1807–1857, demolished 1858)

Austria

 Hofburg (President, formerly the Emperor)
 Ballhausplatz Nr. 2 (Chancellor)
 Jagdschloss Mürzsteg (Summer retreat of the President)

Former royal residences
 Schönbrunn Palace

Azerbaijan
 Residence of Zagulba
 Presidential Mountain Palace – Rest residence in Gabala

Bahamas

 Government House (Governor-General)

Bahrain
Rifa'a Palace (King)
Al-Sakhir Palace (King)
Shaikh Isa Palace (King)
Al Rawda Palace (King)
Al-Qudaibiya Palace (Prime Minister)

Bangladesh

Bangabhaban (President)
Gonobhaban (Prime Minister)
Uttara Gonobhaban (Retreat)

Barbados
State House (President)
Ilaro Court (Prime Minister)

Belarus

 Independence Palace of Belarus (President)
  (President)

Belgium
 Royal Palace of Brussels (Monarch's working palace)
 Château de Laeken (Monarch's residence)
 Ciergnon Castle (Monarch's Ardennes residence)
  (Prime Minister's residence)
  / Wetstraat 16 (Prime Minister's office)

Belize
 Belize House (Governor-General)

Former
 Government House (Governor-General, formerly; kept for official government functions, state guest house for visiting foreign dignitaries, and as House of Culture Museum)

Benin
 Presidential Palace

Bhutan
Dechencholing Palace (King)

Bolivia

 Palacio Quemado (President's office)
 Palace of Calacoto (Official residence of the President)
 Castillo blanco (Winter residence of the President)
 Principado de la Glorieta (Summer residence of the President)
 Villa Albina (Summer residence of the President)
 Mercado street (Office prime minister)
 Casa Verde (Official residence of the prime minister)

Bosnia and Herzegovina

 Presidency Building
 Konak Residence  (state guest house)

Botswana
 State House (President)

Brazil

 Palácio da Alvorada (Presidential residence)
 Palácio do Planalto (Presidential office)
 Granja do Torto (President, retreat)
 Palácio Rio Negro (President, retreat)
 Palácio do Jaburu (Vice President)

Former
 Catete Palace (President, formerly; kept as Museu da República)
 Palace of São Cristóvão (King and Emperor, formerly; kept as the National Museum of Brazil)
 Palácio Imperial de Petrópolis (Emperor, summer residence, formerly; kept as Imperial Museum of Brazil)

State

 
Bahia
Palácio de Ondina
Palácio da Aclamação (former)
Palácio Rio Branco (former)
 Federal District
Palácio do Buriti
Maranhão
Palácio dos Leões
Minas Gerais
Cidade Administrativa de Minas Gerais
 Pernambuco
 Palácio Campo das Princesas
 Rio de Janeiro
 Palácio das Laranjeiras
Rio Grande do Sul
Palácio Piratini
São Paulo
Palácio dos Bandeirantes

Brunei
 Istana Nurul Iman (Sultan)

Bulgaria

Current
 The Largo (A complex of government office buildings in Sofia):
 Dondukov 1 (The office of the Council of Ministers)
 Dondukov 2 (The office of the President)
 National Assembly office building
 Boyana Residence (A complex of residential buildings outside Sofia):
 Home № 1 (National History Museum)
 Home № 2 (Residences of the members of the Cabinet)
 Villa Kalina (The home of the President)
 Euxinograd (former royal residence outside Varna; currently used by the President and Prime Minister)

Former royal residences
 The Royal Palace (former royal residence in Sofia; currently the National Art Gallery)
 Vrana Palace (former royal residence outside Sofia; currently used by Tsar Simeon II)
 Tsarska Bistritsa (former royal residence outside Samokov; currently used by Tsar Simeon II)

Burundi
 Kiriri Presidential Palace

Cambodia

 Royal Palace (King, official)
 The Royal Residence (King, secondary)
 Peace Palace (Prime Minister)

Cameroon
 Unity Palace

Canada

Federal

 Rideau Hall (monarch, governor general, Ottawa residence)
 Citadelle of Quebec (monarch, governor general, Quebec City residence)

 24 Sussex Drive (prime minister)
 Harrington Lake (prime minister, country retreat)
 Stornoway (leader of the opposition)
 The Farm, Gatineau Park (speaker of the House of Commons)
 7 Rideau Gate (state guest house)

Provincial
 British Columbia:Government House (monarch, lieutenant governor)
 Manitoba:Government House (monarch, lieutenant governor)
 New Brunswick:Old Government House (monarch, lieutenant governor)
 Newfoundland and Labrador:Government House (monarch, lieutenant governor)
 Nova Scotia:Government House (monarch, lieutenant governor)
 Prince Edward Island:Government House (monarch, lieutenant governor)
 Quebec:Édifice Price/Price Building (premier)

The provinces of Ontario and Quebec no longer have official residences for their lieutenant governors, but do provide them with accommodations; in the case of Ontario, only if necessary. There is a Government House in Regina, Saskatchewan, though it does not serve as a residence, containing only the lieutenant governor's offices. Alberta also has a Government House, but it is used solely for official entertaining and meetings.

Cape Verde

 Palácio Presidencial

Central African Republic
 Renaissance Palace

Chad
 Presidential Palace

Chile

 None. The President uses own private residence.
 Presidential Palace of Cerro Castillo, Viña del Mar (President, retreat)

Former
 Palacio de La Moneda (President, formerly; kept as office for President)

China

 Zhongnanhai (Communist Party/State Council)
 Jade Spring Hill (Villa area of the Central Military Commission)
 Beidaihe District (Communist Party's summer retreat place)
 Diaoyutai State Guesthouse (visiting dignitaries)

Former
Office and Residence
 Presidential Palace in Nanjing (1912, 1927–1937, 1946–1949; kept as museum from 1998)
 Qing army and the naval department in Beijing (1912–1928)
 Fortress Park and the Prince Chun Mansion of Zhongnanhai (1912–1928)
 Guangzhou Guanyinshan (now Yuexiu Shan) Yuexiu Building (1917–1922, the building destroyed in 1922, today this site for the Guangzhou Zhongshan Memorial Hall)
 Republic of China Lu Haijun Grand Marshal base camp was established in Guangzhou, was established in the original Guangdong Shi Min soil factory (1923–1925；now Sun Yat-sen Marshal House Memorial Hall)
 Wuhan Nanyang Building (1926–1927)
 Reorganized National Government of the Republic of China Headquarters in Nanjing (1940–1945)
 Residence of Wang Jingwei in Nanjing (1940–1945)
 Chongqing Nationalist Government Building (1937–1945)
 Huangshan official residence (1938–1945, Chiang Kai-shek's residence in Chongqing) 
 Huangpu Road official residence (1929–1937, 1945–1949; also called Qi Ru, Chiang Kai-shek's residence in Nanjing) 
 Shuangqing Villa in Beijing (former residence of Mao Zedong at 1949)
Residence
Forbidden City (Emperor)
Zhongnanhai in Beijing (Emperor, family)
Old Summer Palace (Emperor, retreat)
Mukden Palace (Emperor, summer residence)
Chengde Mountain Resort (Emperor, summer residence)
Summer Palace (Emperor, retreat)
Imperial Palace of the Manchu State  (Emperor of Manchukuo)
Manchukuo General Affairs State Council building (Prime Minister of Manchukuo)
Manchukuo Prime Minister's residence (residence of Zhang Jinghui)

Special administrative regions

Hong Kong

 Government House (Chief Executive)
 Fanling Lodge (Chief Executive – Summer)
 Victoria House and Victoria Flats (15 Barker Road, The Peak) (Chief Secretary)
 Residence of the Financial Secretary (45 Shouson Hill Road, Deep Water Bay) (Financial Secretary)
 Residence of Secretary for Justice (19 Severn Road, The Peak) (Secretary for Justice)
 Chief Justice's House (19 Gough Hill Road, The Peak) (Chief Justice of the Court of Final Appeal) Also Known as Clavadel
 Headquarters House (11 Barker Road, The Peak) (Commanding Officer of PLA in Hong Kong)
 Grenville House (Residence for Tung Chee Hwa during his time as Chief Executive 1997-2006)

Macau
 Government House (Chief Executive)

Former Portuguese Macau
 Macau Government Headquarters was both the official residence and office for the Governor of Macau until 1999.

Former British Colony of Hong Kong
 Flagstaff House (commander of British forces in Hong Kong, formerly until 1978)
 Island House (formerly, District Officers (North), and later District Commissioners for the New Territories)
 Gate Lodge (Governor of Hong Kong's summer residence 1900–1934)
 Mountain Lodge (summer residence 1867–1897)
 Beaconsfield House

Colombia

Casa de Nariño (President)
Hacienda Hato Grande (President, retreat)
Casa de Huspedes Ilustres (President, summer retreat) Cartagena

Comoros
 Presidential Palace

Congo, Democratic Republic of the
 Palais de la Nation

Former
 Palais du mont Ngaliema (residence of Mobutu Sese Seko)
 Palais de Marbre (residence of Laurent-Désiré Kabila)

Congo, Republic of the
 Brazzaville Presidential Palace

Costa Rica
 Casa Presidencial, Costa Rica (President)

Côte d'Ivoire
Le Palais de la Présidence (President)

Croatia
 Predsjednički dvori (President)
 Banski dvori (Government)

Cuba

Palace of the Revolution (First Secretary)

Former
Presidential Palace (President)
Punto Cero, Playa, Havana (Fidel Castro's private residence)

Cyprus
 Presidential Palace

Czech Republic

 Prague Castle (President)
 The Lány Chateau (President, summer residence)
 Kramářova Vila (Prime Minister)

Denmark

 Gråsten Palace (Monarch, summer residence)
 Amalienborg Palace (Monarch, winter residence)
 Fredensborg Palace (Monarch, spring and autumn residence)
 Marselisborg Palace (Monarch, summer retreat)
 The Hermitage Palace (Monarch)
 Sorgenfri Palace (Monarch)
 Chancellory House (Crown Prince and family)
 Marienborg (Prime Minister, Official Residence/Summer Retreat)

Former
 Frederiksborg Palace
 Kronborg
 Rosenborg Castle
 Frederiksberg Palace

Djibouti
 Presidential Palace

Dominica
 Government House (President)

Dominican Republic

Palacio Nacional, Dominican Republic (President)

East Timor
 Nicolau Lobato Presidential Palace (President)

Ecuador

 Palacio de Carondelet (President)

Egypt
 Abdeen Palace
 Heliopolis Palace
 Koubbeh Palace
 Montaza Palace
 Ras el-Tin Palace

El Salvador
 Casa Presidencial, also called Casa Blanca (President)

Equatorial Guinea
 Malabo Government Building

Eritrea
 Asmara President's Office

Estonia

Presidential Palace (President)
Stenbock House (Prime minister)

Former
Oru Palace (President, 1935–1940, summer residence)
Paslepa Residence (President, 199?–2008, summer residence)

Eswatini
 Lozitha Palace (King)

Ethiopia
 National Palace (President)
 Imperial Palace (Prime Minister)

Fiji
 Government House (President)

Finland

 Presidential Palace (president, state official use)
 Mäntyniemi, also Talludden (private residence President)
 Kultaranta, also Gullranda (summer residence the President)
 Kesäranta, also Villa Bjälbo (Prime Minister)

Former
 Tamminiemi (President, formerly; kept as Urho Kekkonen Museum)

France

 Élysée Palace (President)
 La Lanterne (Versailles) (President, retreat)
 Fort de Brégançon (President, summer residence)
 Château de Rambouillet (President, former summer residence)
 Domaine de Souzy-la-Briche (Prime Minister, summer residence)
 Hôtel de Matignon (Prime Minister)
 Hôtel de Lassay (President of the National Assembly)
 Petit Luxembourg (President of the Senate)
 Hôtel de Marigny (state guest house)

Former royal residences
 Château de Blois
 Château de Chambord
 Château de Compiègne
Château de Malmaison
 Château de Saint-Germain-en-Laye
 Louvre Palace
 Palace of Fontainebleau
 Palace of Versailles

Territorial
French Polynesia
 Presidence (President of French Polynesia)
 Haut Commissariat (High Commissioner of French Polynesia)

Gabon
 Presidential Palace

Gambia
State House (President)

Georgia
 Avlabari Presidential Palace (2009-2018)
 Orbeliani Palace (since 2018)

Germany

Current

Federal
 Bundespräsidialamt (President, office)
 Schloss Bellevue (President, residence)
 Villa Hammerschmidt (President, retreat)
 Bundeskanzleramt (Chancellor, residence)
 Palais Schaumburg (Chancellor, retreat)
 Schloss Meseberg, Gransee (Official Guest house for Berlin)
 Gästehaus auf dem Petersberg, Königswinter (Official Guest house for Bonn)

States
 Villa Reitzenstein, Stuttgart, State of Baden-Württemberg
 Bayerische Staatskanzlei, Munich, Free State of Bavaria
 Rotes Rathaus, Berlin, City State of Berlin
 Staatskanzlei Brandenburg, Potsdam, State of Brandenburg
 Haus der Bürgerschaft, Bremen, Free Hanseatic City of Bremen
 Hamburg Rathaus, Hamburg, Free and Hanseatic City of Hamburg
 Grand Hotel Rose, Wiesbaden, State of Hesse
 Staatskanzlei Mecklenburg-Vorpommern, Schwerin, State of Mecklenburg-Vorpommern
 Niedersächsische Staatskanzlei, Hanover, State of Lower Saxony
 Landeshaus Düsseldorf, Düsseldorf, State of North Rhine-Westphalia
 Neues Zeughaus, Mainz, State of Rhineland-Palatinate
 Staatskanzlei des Saarlandes, Saarbrücken, State of Saarland
 Sächsische Staatskanzlei, Dresden, Free State of Saxony
 Palais am Fürstenwall, Magdeburg, State of Saxony-Anhalt
 Staatskanzlei Schleswig-Holstein, Kiel, Schleswig-Holstein
 Kurmainzische Statthalterei, Erfurt, Free State of Thuringia

Former royal residences
Brandenburg/Prussia/Imperial/East Germany/Former West Germany

 Stadtschloss, Potsdam (now Landtag of Brandenburg seat)
 Babelsberg Palace, Potsdam
 Cecilienhof, Potsdam
 New Palace, Potsdam
 Sanssouci, Potsdam
 Berlin Palace, Berlin
 Charlottenburg Palace, Berlin
 Kronprinzenpalais, Berlin
 Reich Chancellery (office of the Chancellor of Germany)
 Friedrichsruh Manor, (Otto von Bismarck's residence in Herzogtum Lauenburg, Schleswig-Holstein, near Hamburg)
 Varzin Manor, (Otto von Bismarck's residence in Farther Pomerania)
 Führerbunker, (Adolf Hitler's Berlin residence)
 Berghof, (Adolf Hitler's Berchtesgaden residence)
 Kehlsteinhaus (Adolf Hitler's Berchtesgaden residence)
 Wolf's Lair (Adolf Hitler's first Eastern Front military headquarters in World War II)
 Führer Headquarters
 Schoenhausen Palace, Berlin East German President (1949–1960)
 Majakowskiring, Berlin East German Leadership compound (to 1960), 
 Waldsiedlung, East German Leadership compound (1960–1990), North of Berlin near Wandlitz, Brandenburg
 Bundeskanzleramt, Bonn, (Office of Chancellor of Germany, 1976–1999), today used for seat of Federal Ministry for Economic Cooperation and Development
 Kanzlerbungalow, Bonn, Private residence of the Chancellor of Germany and his family 1964–1999
Other

 Dresden Castle
 Karlsruhe Palace
 Ludwigsburg Palace
 Munich Residenz
 Mannheim Palace
 Schloss Oldenburg
 Residential Palace Darmstadt
 Schwerin Castle (Landtag of Mecklenburg-Vorpommern seat)
 Veste Coburg
 Schloss Weimar

Ghana
 Osu Castle formal (Presidential) residence
 Golden Jubilee House current (Presidential) residence
 Peduase Lodge (Presidential) retreat

Greece
 Presidential Mansion (President, formerly the King)
 Maximos Mansion (Prime Minister)

Former
Palace of Dekeleia (Kings of Greece)

Grenada
 Government House (Governor-General)

Guatemala

 Casa Presidencial

Former
 National Palace (Guatemala)

Guyana
 State House (President)

Guinea
 Presidential Palace
 Villa Syli (official guest house)

Former
 Belle Vue (demolished; former summer residence of the President)

Guinea-Bissau

 Presidential Palace

Haiti

Former

 National Palace (destroyed by the 2010 earthquake)

Honduras
 Palacio José Cecilio del Valle (President)

Hungary

Sándor Palace (President)
Carmelite Monastery (Prime Minister)

Former
 Buda Castle (King, formerly; retained as Historical Museum of Budapest and Hungarian National Gallery)

Iceland
 Bessastaðir (President)

India

Union

 Rashtrapati Bhavan (President)
 Rashtrapati Nilayam (President, retreat)
 The Retreat Building (President, retreat)
 Rashtrapati Ashiana (President, retreat)
 Rashtrapati Niwas (Viceroy of India's Viceregal Lodge 1888 - 1947 formerly; President, retreat 1947 - 1965 formerly)
 Uparashtrapati Bhavan (Vice President)
 7, Lok Kalyan Marg (Prime Minister)
 Hyderabad House (State guest house)

State
 Andhra Pradesh:Raj Bhavan, Vijayawada (Governor)
 Arunachal Pradesh:Raj Bhavan, Itanagar (Governor)
 Assam:Raj Bhavan, Guwahati (Governor)
 Bihar:Raj Bhavan, Patna (Governor) 1, Aney Marg (Chief Minister)
 Chhattisgarh:Raj Bhavan, Raipur (Governor)
 Goa:Raj Bhavan, Panaji (Governor)
 Gujarat:Raj Bhavan, Gandhinagar (Governor)
 Haryana:Raj Bhavan, Haryana (Governor)
 Himachal Pradesh:Raj Bhavan, Shimla (Governor) Oakover (Chief Minister)
 Jharkhand:Raj Bhavan, Ranchi (Governor)
 Karnataka:Raj Bhavan, Bangalore (Governor) Anugraha (Chief Minister)
 Kerala:Raj Bhavan, Thiruvananthapuram (Governor) Cliff House (Chief Minister)
 Madhya Pradesh:Raj Bhavan, Bhopal (Governor)Raj Bhavan, Pachmarhi (Governor, summer residence)
 Maharashtra:Raj Bhavan, Mumbai (Governor)Raj Bhavan, Nagpur (Governor, winter residence)Raj Bhavan, Pune (Governor, monsoon residence)Raj Bhavan, Mahabaleshwar (Governor, summer residence)Varsha Bungalow (Chief Minister)
 Manipur:Raj Bhavan, Imphal (Governor)
 Meghalaya:Raj Bhavan, Shillong (Governor)
 Mizoram:Raj Bhavan, Aizawl (Governor)
 Nagaland:Raj Bhavan, Kohima (Governor)
 Odisha:Raj Bhavan, Bhubaneswar (Governor)  Raj Bhavan, Puri (Governor, summer residence)
 Punjab:Raj Bhavan, Punjab (Governor)
 Rajasthan:Raj Bhavan, Jaipur (Governor)
 Sikkim:Raj Bhavan, Gangtok (Governor)
 Tamil Nadu:Raj Bhavan, Chennai (Governor)Raj Bhavan, Ooty (Governor, summer residence)
 Telangana:Raj Bhavan, Hyderabad (Governor) Pragathi Bhavan (Chief Minister)
 Tripura:Raj Bhavan, Agartala (Governor)
 Uttar Pradesh:Raj Bhavan, Lucknow (Governor) 5, Kalidas Marg (Chief Minister)
 Uttarakhand:Raj Bhavan, Dehradun (Governor)Raj Bhavan, Nainital (Governor, summer residence)
 West Bengal:Raj Bhavan, Kolkata (Governor)Raj Bhavan, Darjeeling (Governor, summer residence)

Union territories
 Andaman and Nicobar Islands: Raj Niwas, Port Blair (Lieutenant Governor)
 Delhi: Raj Niwas, Delhi (Lieutenant Governor)
 Jammu and Kashmir:Raj Bhavan, Jammu (Lieutenant Governor, winter residence)Raj Bhavan, Srinagar (Lieutenant Governor, summer residence)
 Ladakh: Raj Niwas, Leh (Lieutenant Governor)
 Puducherry: Raj Niwas, Pondicherry (Lieutenant Governor)

Indonesia

 Istana Negara, Jakarta (President)
 Istana Merdeka, Jakarta (President)
 Rumah Dinas Wakil Presiden, Jakarta (Vice President)
 Istana Bogor, Bogor, West Java (President, retreat)
 Istana Cipanas, Cipanas, West Java (President, retreat)
 Istana Tampaksiring, Bali (President)
 Gedung Agung, Yogyakarta (President)

Provincial
 West Java:Gedung Pakuan, Bandung, West Java (Governor)
 Aceh:Meligoe Aceh (Governor)
 East Kalimantan:Lamin Etam (Governor)
 East Java:Gedung Grahadi (Governor)
 Yogyakarta:Kraton Ngayogyakarta Hadiningrat (Governor/Sultan)

Iran
 Beit Rahbari Complex (Supreme Leader)
 Sa'dabad Palace (President)

Former
 Ali Qapu (Safavid dynasty, formerly; kept as museum)
 Golestan Palace (Qajar dynasty, formerly; kept as museum)
 Marble Palace  (Pahlavi dynasty, kept as museum)
 Niavaran Palace Complex (Pahlavi dynasty, formerly; kept as museum)
 Ramsar Palace (Pahlavi dynasty, kept as museum)
 Sadabad Palace (Pahlavi dynasty, formerly; Some buildings are kept as museum and some are still used by the government)

Iraq
 Radwaniyah Palace: (President)
 Republican Palace: (Prime Minister)
 Al Zaqura Building: (Prime Minister)

Ireland

 Áras an Uachtaráin (President)
 Steward's Lodge (Taoiseach's 'unofficial residence'; the Taoiseach's office is in Government Buildings, Dublin)
 Farmleigh (visiting foreign dignitaries)

Former
 Hill of Tara (Ard-Rí)
 Dublin Castle (seat of British rule prior to independence in 1922)
 Chief Secretary's Lodge, now the U.S. Ambassador's Residence (Chief Secretary for Ireland)
 Viceregal Lodge, now Áras an Uachtaráin (Lord Lieutenant / Governor-General)

Israel

 Beit HaNassi ("President's House") (President)
 Beit Aghion ("Aghion House") (Prime Minister)
 King David Hotel (visiting dignitaries)

Italy

 Quirinal Palace (President, residence; formerly residence of the Pope and then of the King)
 Castelporziano (President, retreat)
 Villa Rosebery (President, summer retreat)
 Chigi Palace (Prime Minister)
 Villa Doria Pamphili (International meetings)
 Villa Madama (International meetings)
 Palazzo Giustiniani (President of the Senate)

Former residences
 Villa Farnese (former summer presidential residence)
 Palazzo del Viminale (formerly Prime Minister, now seat of the Ministry of the Interior)
 Palazzo Venezia (Mussolini's office)
 Villa Torlonia (Rome) (Mussolini's residence)
 Residences of the Royal House of Savoy (Royal family's residences in Piedmont)
 Royal Palace of Caserta (Royal family)
 Royal Palace of Milan (Royal family)
 Royal Villa of Monza (Royal family)
Royal Palace of Naples (Royal family)

Jamaica
 King's House, also Government House (Governor-General)
 Jamaica House (Prime Minister's office)
 Vale Royal (Prime Minister)

Japan

 Tokyo Imperial Palace, Official Residence of the (Emperor of Japan)

 Tōgū Palace, Official Residence of the (Crown Prince of Japan)

 Kantei, Official Residence of the (Prime Minister of Japan)

 Akasaka Palace, Official State Guest House of Japan
 Kyoto State Guest House, Second Official State Guest House of Japan
 Multiple Imperial Villas serve as Winter, Summer and Country retreats for the Emperor and the Imperial Family.

Former
 Kyoto Imperial Palace, also known as Kyōto Imperial Palace (Emperor, until 1869; kept as museum)
 Osaka Castle, also known as one of Japan's most famous landmarks  (residence of Kampaku Toyotomi Hideyoshi, now kept as Osaka Castle Park)
 Edo Castle, (Tokugawa shogunate, 1603–1867; demolished, now part of Imperial Palace Gardens)
 Tokyo Metropolitan Teien Art Museum, also known as Prince Asaka Residence (Prime Minister, 1947 and 48–50, now open to the public as a museum)

Jordan
Raghadan Palace (King)
Al Hummar Palace (used for state receptions)
Basman Palace (King)
Al Qasr al Sagheer (King)

Kazakhstan

 Ak Orda Presidential Palace (President)

Kenya
State House (President)

Kosovo
 
Presidenca e Republikës së Kosovës (Official workplace of the President)
Qeveria e Republikës së Kosovës (Official workplace of the Prime Minister)

Kuwait
 Seif Palace (also known as the Amiri Diwan or Emir's Palace) (Emir)
 Bayan Palace (Emir)
 Dar Salwa (Emir)

Former
 Dasman Palace (Emir, formerly)

Kyrgyzstan
 White House, also Government House or Presidential Palace
 Ala Archa State Residence (President, Prime Minister, Former Presidents)

Laos
 Presidential Palace (President)

Former
 Royal Palace, Luang Prabang (also known as Haw Kham, former residence of the King of Laos)

Latvia
 Rīgas pils (President)

Lebanon

 Baabda Palace (President)
 Beiteddine Palace (President, summer retreat)
 Grand Serail (Prime Minister)
 Ain Al Tine Palace (Parliament Speaker)

Former
 Beiteddine Palace (Prince, formerly; kept as a museum)

Lesotho
Royal Palace (King)
State House (Prime Minister)

Liberia
Executive Mansion (President)

Libya
Al-Sikka, Tripoli (Government of National Unity) 
Al Nasr Convention Centre (General National Congress, formerly)
Dar al-Salam Hotel (House of Representatives)
Abusita Navy Base (Presidential Council) 
Royal Palace of Tripoli (King, formerly)
Bab al-Azizia (Leader and Guide of the Revolution, formerly)

Liechtenstein
Vaduz Castle (Prince)

Lithuania
Presidential Palace

Former
 Historical Presidential Palace, Kaunas (President, formerly; kept as museum)
 Royal Palace of Lithuania (formerly Grand Duke)

Luxembourg

 Grand Ducal Palace (Monarch)
 Berg Castle (Monarch)
 Fischbach Castle (Grand Duke Jean)
 Hôtel de Bourgogne (Prime minister)

Madagascar
 Iavoloha
 Ambohitsorohitra

Malawi
 Sanjika Palace (President)
 New State House (President)

Malaysia

Federal
Istana Negara, Kuala Lumpur (King)
Seri Perdana, Putrajaya (Prime Minister)
 Seri Satria, Putrajaya (Deputy Prime Minister)

State
PerlisIstana Arau (Raja)Chief Minister's Official Residence (Chief Minister)
KedahIstana Anak Bukit (Sultan)Seri Mentaloon (Chief Minister)
PenangSeri Mutiara (Governor)Seri Teratai (Chief Minister)
PerakIstana Iskandariah (Sultan, largely ceremonial)Istana Kinta (Sultan)Chief Minister's Official Residence (Chief Minister)
SelangorIstana Alam Shah (Sultan, largely ceremonial)Istana Bukit Kayangan (Sultan)Chief Minister's Official Residence (Chief Minister)
Negeri SembilanIstana Besar Seri Menanti (Yang di-Pertuan Besar)Chief Minister's Official Residence (Chief Minister)
MalaccaIstana Melaka (Governor)Seri Bendahara (Chief Minister)
JohorIstana Besar (Sultan, largely ceremonial)Istana Bukit Serene (Sultan)Saujana (Chief Minister)
PahangIstana Abu Bakar (Sultan)Chief Minister's Official Residence (Chief Minister)
TerengganuIstana Syarqiyyah (Sultan)Seri Iman (Chief Minister)
KelantanIstana Balai Besar (Sultan, largely ceremonial)Istana Negeri (Sultan)JKR 10 (Chief Minister)
SabahIstana Seri Kinabalu (Governor)Seri Gaya (Chief Minister)
SarawakThe Astana (Governor)Demak Jaya (Premier)

Former
 Former Istana Negara at Jalan Istana (King, former official residence)
PenangSuffolk House (Former Governor's residence)
MalaccaOld Governor's residence (Former Governor and Yang di-Pertua Negeri's residence)

Maldives

 Muliaage (President)
 Hilaaleege Official residence (Vice President)

Former
 Theemuge (President, formerly; now the Supreme Court of the Maldives)

Mali
 Presidential Palace

Malta

 San Anton Palace (Official Residence of the President)
 Verdala Palace (Summer Residence of the President)
 Villa Francia (Official Residence of the Prime Minister)
 Girgenti Palace (Summer Residence of the Prime Minister)

Former
 Fort St. Angelo (former residence of the Grand Master, now restored)
 Grandmaster's Palace (former residence of the Grand Master and the Governor, now housing the Office of the President and a museum)
 Palazzo Vilhena (former residence of the Grand Master, now a museum)
 Aħrax Tower (former summer residence of the Governor, now abandoned)
 Casa Leoni (former residence of the Governor, now housing a government ministry)

Mauritania
 Presidential Palace

Mauritius
 State House (President)
 Clarisse House (Prime Ministers)

Mexico

 National Palace (President)

Former
 Los Pinos (Presidential residence and office)
 Castillo de Chapultepec (Emperor then President, formerly; kept as National Museum of History)
*In every state of the Mexico the Palacio de Gobierno, or Government Palace, was the official residence the governor, they are now maintained solely as the relevant governor's offices.
Casa Borda, Cuernavaca (Emperor's summer residence, formerly; kept as a cultural centre)

States
Querétaro
 Casa de la Corregidora (Governor mansion)

Moldova
 Presidential Palace

Transnistria
 Presidential Palace, Tiraspol

Monaco
Palais Princier de Monaco (Monarch)
Résidence du ministre d'État (Minister of State)

Mongolia
 Government Palace (Offices of the President and Prime Minister)
 The Marshal Mansion (President, former winter residence of Khorloogiin Choibalsan and Yumjaagiin Tsedenbal)
 Ikh Tenger Complex (President's residence)

Montenegro
 Blue Palace (Official Residence of the President)

Morocco
 Dar al-Makhzen, Rabat (main residence)
 Dar al-Makhzen, Fes
 Dar al-Makhzen, Marrakesh
 Dar al-Makhzen, Meknes
 Marchane Palace, Tangier
 Bahia Palace, Marrakech

Mozambique
 Palácio da Ponta Vermelha (President)

Myanmar
 Presidential Palace (Prime Minister during the current state of emergency, normally President)
 Zeyadili Palace (Tatmadaw Headquarters)

Former
 Government House (Governor)
 Belmond Governor's Residence (Governor)
 Zayar Thiri Baikman in Yangon (Tatmadaw Headquarters)

Namibia
 State House (President)

Nauru
 State House (President; formerly kept as immigration detention center)

Netherlands

 The Royal Palace (official reception palace for foreign dignitaries and used for weddings and the act of abdication)
 Palace Huis ten Bosch (official residence of the king)
 Noordeinde Palace (official working palace of the king)
 Soestdijk Palace (former royal residence of Queen Juliana)
 Het Loo Palace (former royal summer residence of Queen Wilhelmina)
 Catshuis (official residence of the prime minister of the Netherlands)

Nepal
 Sheetal Niwas (President)
Baluwatar (Prime Minister)

New Zealand
 Government House (Governor-General)
 Government House (Governor-General, Auckland residence)
 Premier House (Prime Minister)

Former
Old Government House, Auckland

Realm
Cook Islands: Government House (Queen's Representative)
 Tokelau: Government House (Administrator)

Nicaragua
 Presidential Palace
 El Carmen Residence (Residence of president Daniel Ortega)
 Presidential Palace (former)

Niger
 Presidential Palace

Nigeria

Federal
Aso Villa (President)

State
 Rivers State:Government House (Governor)

North Korea

 DPRK Leadership Residence (39°0'56"N 125°44'43"E)
 Ryongsong Residence (Chairman of National Defense Commission)
 Kangdong Residence
 Sinuiju North Korean Leader's Residence
 Paekhwawon State Guest House

Former
 Kumsusan Palace of the Sun (President, formerly; kept as mausoleum)

North Macedonia
 Villa Vodno (Official Presidential workplace)

Norway

 Royal Palace (Oslo)
 Bygdøy Royal Estate (Monarch, summer retreat)
 Oscarshall Castle
 Akershus Castle
 Gamlehaugen (Monarch, Bergen)
 Ledaal (Monarch, Stavanger)
 Stiftsgården (Monarch, Trondheim)
 Skaugum Estate (Crown Prince)
 Inkognitogata 18 (Prime Minister)
 Riddervolds gate 2 (Visiting foreign dignitaries)

Oman
Al Alam Palace
Bait Barka
Hisn Al Shomoukh
Royal Court
Hisn Salalah
Sohar Palace
Qasr Mamoora
Razat Farm

Pakistan

Federal
 Aiwan-e-Sadr (President)
 Prime Minister House (Prime Minister)

Provincial
 Balochistan:Governor's House
 Khyber Pakhtunkhwa:Governor's House
 Punjab:Governor's House
 Sindh:Governor's House

Palestine
Mukataa (PLO)

Panama
 Palacio de las Garzas (President)

Papua New Guinea
 Government House (Governor-General)

Paraguay

 Mburuvichá Roga (President)
 Palacio de los López (Presidential office)

Peru

 Palacio de Gobierno (President)

Philippines

 Malacañang Palace, Manila (President)
 Malacañang sa Sugbo, Cebu City (President, official residence in Visayas)
 Presidential Guest House (Malacañang of the South), Davao City (President, official residence in Mindanao)
 Mansion House, Baguio (President, official summer residence)
 Quezon City Reception House, Quezon City (Vice President)

Former
 Independence House, Aguinaldo Shrine, Kawit, Cavite (de facto official residence of First Philippine Republic and Republic of Biak-na-Bato)
 Palacio del Gobernador, Intramuros, Manila (residence of Governor-General of the Philippines)
 Malolos Cathedral, Malolos, Bulacan (official residence of First Philippine Republic)
 Malacañang ti Amianan, Paoay, Ilocos Norte (former residence of the late Ferdinand Marcos; now a memorial museum)
 Leyte Provincial Capitol, seat of the Commonwealth of the Philippines

Poland

 Presidential Palace in Warsaw (President)
 Villa Parkowa (Official residence of Prime Minister)
 Belweder in Warsaw (President's residence until 1994; since then kept for official government functions and visiting foreign dignitaries)
 Presidential Castle in Wisła
 Presidential Manor House in Ciechocinek
 Presidential Residence in Hel
 Presidential Residence in Lucień
 Presidential Residence in Ruda Tarnowska
 Presidential Villa in Klarysew part of Konstancin-Jeziorna

Former 

 Wawel Castle
 Royal Castle (King, formerly; now museum)
Wilanów Palace
Palace on the Isle
Sanok Castle
Zhovkva Castle
Malbork Castle
Brzeg Castle
Ujazdów Castle
Piotrków Trybunalski Castle
Niepołomice Castle
Palace of the Grand Dukes of Lithuania
Saxon Palace
Tykocin Castle

Portugal

 Belém Palace (President of the Republic)
 Palace of the Dukes of Braganza (President of the Republic, official residence in the North Region)
 Citadel of Cascais (President of the Republic, official summer residence)
 São Bento Mansion (Prime Minister)
 Palace of Necessidades (Ministry of Foreign Affairs)
 Fort of São Julião da Barra (Minister of National Defence)
 Palace of São Lourenço (Representative of the Republic in Madeira)
 Madre de Deus Manor (Representative of the Republic in the Azores)
 Queluz Palace (state guest house)

Former 
 Ajuda Royal Palace (official royal residence)
 Alcáçova Palace at São Jorge Castle (official royal residence)
 Alcáçova Palace at Coimbra (official royal residence)
 Évora Royal Palace (official royal residence)
 Royal Building of Mafra (Palace and Basilica) (official royal residence)
 Necessidades Royal Palace (official royal residence)
 Ribeira Royal Palace (official royal residence)
 Queluz Royal Palace (summer residence turned official royal residence)
 Sintra Royal Palace (summer residence turned official royal residence)

Qatar
 Emir's Palace (Emir)
 Al Wajba Palace (Emir)

Romania
 Cotroceni Palace (office of the President)
 Vila Lac 3 (residence of the President)
 Victoria Palace (office of the Prime Minister of Romania)
 Elisabeta Palace (official residence of HM Margareta of Romania)
 Săvârșin Castle (residence of HM Margareta of Romania)

Russia

 Kremlin (President)
 Zavidovo (President)
 Novo-Ogaryovo (President)
 White House (Prime Minister)

Former
 Alexander Palace (Tsar, formerly; kept as museum)
 Anichkov Palace (Tsar, formerly; kept as Pioneers Palace)
 Catherine Palace (Tsar, summer retreat, formerly; kept as museum)
 Nicholas Palace (Tsar, formerly; kept as commercial offices)
 Oraniembaum (Tsar, formerly; kept as museum)
 Pavlovsk (Tsar, formerly; kept as museum)
 Peterhof Palace (Tsar, formerly; kept as museum)
 Pella Palace (Tsar, summer retreat, formerly; demolished)
 Summer Palace (Tsar, summer retreat, formerly; demolished)
 Tauride Palace (Tsar, formerly; kept as offices for Interparliamentary Assembly of Member Nations of the Commonwealth of Independent States)
 Vladimir Palace (Tsar, formerly; kept as Academics' House)
 Winter Palace (Tsar, winter retreat, formerly; kept as museum)
 Yelagin Palace (Tsar, summer retreat, formerly; kept as museum)
 Kuntsevo Dacha (Summer residence of Joseph Stalin)
 Stalin's Dacha in Sochi (Summer residence of Joseph Stalin)

Republics

 Adygea:Building of the Administration of the Republic Of Adygea, Maykop (Head)
 Bashkortostan:Republic House (Head)
 Buryatia:54 Ulitsa Lenina, Ulan-Ude (Head)
 Chechnya:Residence of the Head of the Chechen Republic, Grozny (Head)
 Chuvashia:Government House, Cheboksary (Head)
 Dagestan:White House, Makhachkala (Head)
 Ingushetia:14 Prospekt I. Zyazikova, Magas (Head)
 Karachay-Cherkessia:Government House, Cherkessk (Head)
 Republic of Karelia:19 Prospekt Lenina, Petrozavodsk (Head)
 Khakassia:Residence of the Head of the Republic of Khakassia, Abakan (Head)
 Komi Republic:9 Ulitsa Kommunisticheskaya, Syktyvkar (Head)
 Mordovia:Dom Respubliki, Saransk (Head)
 Sakha:11 Ulitsa Kirova, Yakutsk (Head)
 Tatarstan:Kazan Kremlin (President)
 Udmurtia:Palace of the Head of the Udmurt Republic, Izhevsk (Head)

Krais
 Krasnodar Krai:35 Ulitsa Krasnaya, Krasnodar (Governor)

Rwanda
 Urugwiro

Saint Kitts and Nevis
 Government House (Governor-General)

Saint Lucia
 Government House (Governor-General)

Saint Vincent and the Grenadines
 Government House (Governor-General)

Samoa
 Government House (Head of State)

Former
Villa Vailima

São Tomé and Príncipe

 Presidential Palace

Saudi Arabia
 Palace of Yamamah (King)
 Riyadh Qasr Malik Abdullah bin Abdulaziz (King)
 Jeddah Qasr Malik Abdullah bin Abdulaziz (King)
 Mina Royal Palace
 Makkah Royal Palace

Senegal
 Palais de la Republique (President)

Serbia

 Novi dvor (President's office)
 Užička 23 (Presidents residence)
 Beli dvor (Crown Prince)

Former
 Stari dvor (King, formerly; current City Assembly of Belgrade)
 Royal Palace (King, formerly)

Seychelles
 State House (President)

Sierra Leone
 State House (President)

Singapore

 Istana (President; de jure)
 Sri Temasek (Prime Minister)

Slovakia

 Grassalkovich Palace (President)

Slovenia
 Government and Presidential Palace, Ljubljana

Solomon Islands
 Government House (Governor-General)

Somalia
 Villa Somalia (President)

South Africa
 Mahlamba Ndlopfu, Pretoria, (President)
 Genadendal Residence, Cape Town (President)

Provincial
 Leeuwenhof (Premier of the Western Cape)

Provincial, former
 Cape Province:Government House (Governor, formerly; kept as offices for Prime Minister)
 Transvaal:Government House (Lieutenant General, formerly)
 Natal:Government House (Lieutenant-Governor, formerly)
 Orange Free State:Government House (Governor, formerly)

South Korea

 Cheong Wa Dae ("House with Blue Rooftiles") (President; no longer used)
 – Cheong Wa Dae was the official presidential office and residence complex for the President of South Korea before Yoon Suk-yeol. 
 – It is located next to Gyeongbokgung, the main palace during the Joseon dynasty.
 Cheong Nam Dae ("Cheong Wa Dae in the South") (President; no longer used)
 – Cheong Nam Dae used to be one of the two vacation residences for the President of Republic of Korea. It was returned to public in 2003.
 – It is located in Cheongwon-gun, North Chungcheong Province.
 Cheong Hae Dae ("Cheong Wa Dae on the Seashore") (President; no longer used)
 – Cheong Hae Dae used to be one of the two vacation residences for the President of Republic of Korea. Although the president no longer uses this facility this compound is still under the administration of the Republic of Korea Navy, and thus is not open to public access.
 – It is located on one of the islands of Geoje-shi, South Gyeongsang Province.
 Gukhoeuijang Gonggwan ("Official Residence of the Speaker of National Assembly") (Speaker of National Assembly)
 – This is the official residence for the Speaker of the National Assembly of Republic of Korea. The Speaker, also, does not work here.
 – It is located in Hannam-dong, Yongsan-gu, Seoul, where many foreign missions to Korea are located.
 Daebeobwonjang Gonggwan ("Official Residence of the Chief Justice of the Supreme Court") (Chief Justice of the Supreme Court of Korea)
 – This is the official residence for the Chief Justice of the Supreme Court of Korea. The Chief Justice, also, does not work here.
 – It is also located in Hannam-dong, Yongsan-gu, Seoul.
 Heonbeopjaepansojang Gonggwan ("Official Residence of the President of the Constitutional Court") (President of the Constitutional Court of Korea)
 – This is the official residence for the President of the Constitutional Court of Korea. The President of the Court, also, does not work here.
 – It is located close to Cheong Wa Dae.
 Chongri Gonggwan ("Official Residence of the Prime Minister") (Prime Minister)
 – This is the official residence for the Prime Minister of Republic of Korea. The Prime Minister, however, does not work here.
 – It is located close to Cheong Wa Dae.
 Most ministers of state and heads of administrative regions also have official residences, although they are not listed here.

South Sudan
 Presidential Palace

Spain

 Palacio Real de Madrid (Official residence of Spanish monarchs, but used only for state ceremonies. In Madrid's city center)
 Palacio de la Zarzuela (De facto residence of the monarch. Also his office. A few kilometers outside of Madrid's city center)
 Palacio de Marivent (Summer retreat of the monarch. In Majorca, Balearic Islands)
 Reales Alcázares de Sevilla (official residence of the monarch in Andalusia)
 Palacio de Albéniz (official residence of the monarch in Catalonia. In Barcelona)
 Palacio de la Moncloa (President of the Government. Also his office)
 Santa Cruz Palace, Madrid (Minister of Foreign Affairs)

Autonomous communities
 Aragon:Edificio Pignatelli (President of DGA)
 Andalusia:Palacio de San Telmo (President of the Junta)
 Basque Country:Ajuria Enea (Lehendakari)
Catalonia:Casa dels Canonges (President of the Generalitat)
Galicia:Monte Pío (President of the Xunta)
Castile and Leon: Colegio de la Asunción (President of the Junta)

Sri Lanka
 President's House (Official residence in Colombo of the President)
 President's Pavilion (Official residence in Kandy of the President)
 Queen's Cottage (Country retreat of the President)
 Temple Trees (Official residence of the Prime Minister)
 Prime Minister's Cottage (country retreat of the prime minister)
 Speaker's Residence (official residence of the speaker of the Parliament)
 Chief Justice's House (official residence of the chief justice)
 Visumpaya (Residence of a cabinet minister nominated by the president)
 General's House (country retreat for Members of Parliament)
 Bank House, Colombo (official residence of the governor of the Central Bank of Sri Lanka)
 General's House, Colombo (official residence of the commander of the Sri Lanka Army)

Sudan
 Presidential Palace

Suriname
 Gouvernementsgebouw, better known as Presidential Palace

Sweden

Royal

 Royal Palace in Stockholm (official residence since 1754, but not used as such since 1981)
 Drottningholm Palace (everyday residence of TM The King and Queen since 1981)
 Haga Palace (Official residence of TRH The Crown Princess and Prince Daniel, Duke of Västergötland. Palaces owned by the State, at the disposal of the King, but not in use)
 Gripsholm Castle
 Rosendal Palace
 Rosersberg Palace
 Stenhammar Palace
 Strömsholm Palace
 Tullgarn Palace
 Ulriksdal Palace

Former royal residences
 Arvfurstens palats
 Kalmar Castle
 Karlberg Palace
 Nyköping Castle
 Uppsala Castle
 Vadstena Castle
 Wrangel Palace (Official residence 1697–1754)

Prime Ministerial
 Sager House (Official residence of the Prime Minister)
 Harpsund (Country retreat for the Prime Minister)

Gubernatorial
Gävleborg CountyGävle Castle (governor)
Halland CountyHalmstad Castle (governor)
Jönköping CountyThe Residence, Jönköping (governor)
Skåne CountyThe Residence, Malmö (governor)
Stockholm CountyTessin Palace (governor)
Uppsala CountyUppsala Castle (governor)
Västmanland CountyVästerås Castle (governor)
Västra Götaland CountyThe Residence, Gothenburg (governor)
Örebro CountyÖrebro Castle (governor)
Östergötland CountyLinköping Castle (governor)

Switzerland

Official estates of the Swiss Federal Council:
Lohn Estate
Béatrice-von-Wattenwyl-Haus

Syria
New Shaab Palace, on Mount Mazzeh, Damascus
Tishreen Palace, Ar Rabwah, Damascus
President's summer house, built for security and rapid exits on the banks of the Mediterranean Sea

Former
Mustapha Pasha al-Abed's Palace (President) 
Nazim Pashas's Palace (President)

Taiwan

Workplace
 Presidential Office Building (formerly office of Governor-General of Taiwan)
Residence
 Yonghe Residence
 Shilin Official Residence (Former residence of Chiang Kai-shek)
 Guesthouses of Chiang Kai-shek
 Seven Seas Residence(Former residence of Chiang Ching-kuo)
Guest House
 Taipei Guest House
 Grand Hotel (Taipei)

Tajikistan
 Kohi Millat

Tanzania
 State House (President)

Thailand

 Grand Palace (Monarch, official and ceremonial but not residential)
 Dusit Palace (Monarch; parts of it now houses several museums)
 Amphorn Sathan Residential Hall (Monarch, primary residential home of King Vajiralongkorn)
 Chitralada Royal Villa (Formerly of the monarch, now residence of Queen Sirikit)
 Bang Pa-In Royal Palace (Monarch, summer retreat, now generally open to the public)
 Klai Kangwon Villa (Monarch, seaside retreat)
 Bhubing Palace (Monarch, residence at northern)
 Thaksin Ratchaniwet Palace (Monarch, residence at southern)
 Phu Phan Palace (Monarch, residence at northeastern)
 Srapathum Palace (Princess Royal)
 Sukhothai Palace (Princesses, daughters of Vajiralongkorn)
 Chakri Bongkot Palace (Princess Srisavangavadhana)
 Deves Palace (Princess Suddhanarinatha)
 Phitsanulok Mansion (Prime Minister)

Former
 Royal Palace of Sukhothai (Monarch of Sukhothai, now part of Sukhothai Historical Park)
 Chan Palace (Monarch from Sukhothai to Ayutthaya and Viceroy of Ayutthaya, now a historic site)
 Royal Palace of Ayutthaya (Monarch of Ayutthaya, now part of Ayutthaya Historical Park)
 Chandrakasem Palace (Viceroy of Ayutthaya, now the National Museum)
 Suan Luang Palace (Deputy Viceroy of Ayutthaya, now part of Ayutthaya Historical Park)
 King Narai's Palace (Residence of King Narai, now the National Museum)
 Thonburi Palace (Monarch of Thonburi, now the Royal Thai Navy Headquarters)
 Front Palace (Viceroy, now the National Museum)
 Rear Palace (Deputy Viceroy, now Siriraj Hospital)
 Phra Nakhon Khiri Palace (Monarch, summer retreat, now the Historical Park)
 Saranrom Palace (Accommodation of state foreign guests)
 Phra Chuthathut Palace (Summer retreat of King Chulalongkorn, now area of Chulalongkorn University)
 Sanam Chan Palace (Residence of King Vajiravudh, now a museum)
 Phaya Thai Palace (Residence of King Vajiravudh, now a museum)
 Mrigadayavan Palace (Summer retreat of King Vajiravudh)
 Istana Nilam (Monarch of Patani)
 Wiang Keaw Palace (Monarch from Lan Na to Chiang Mai)
 Royal Palace of Phrae (Monarch of Phrae)

Togo
 The Palace of the Governors

Tonga
 Royal Palace (King)

Trinidad and Tobago

 President's House
 St. Anns Diplomatic Residence (Prime Minister)
 Whitehall (Prime Minister's office)
 Official residence (Chief Secretary, Tobago House of Assembly)

Tunisia
 Carthage Palace

Turkey

State 

 Presidential Complex (President), official residence
 Huber Mansion (President)
 Vahdettin Pavilion (State guest house)
 Beylerbeyi Palace (President)
 Dolmabahçe Palace (President)
 Ahlat Mansion (President)
 Florya Marine Mansion (President, formerly)
 Çankaya Mansion (Vice President)

Former 
 Topkapı Palace (Ottoman monarchy)
 Yıldız Palace (Ottoman monarchy)

Turkmenistan
Oguzkhan Presidential Palace (President)

Tuvalu
 Government House (Governor General)

Uganda
 State House (President)

Ukraine

 Mariinskyi Palace (President)
 House with Chimaeras (President)
 House of the Weeping Widow (President)
 Pototsky Palace (President)

Uruguay

 Palacio Estévez (former Presidential office, now protocolar building)
 Torre Ejecutiva (Presidential office)
 Suarez Residence (Presidential residence)
Parque Anchorena (Presidential summer residence)
Residencia de Punta del Este (Presidential summer residence)

United Arab Emirates
 Presidential Diwan in Abu Dhabi  (President)
 Zabeel Palace in Dubai (Vice President & Prime minister)

United Kingdom

 Buckingham Palace (official working palace of the King, the Duke of York and the Duke and Duchess of Edinburgh)
 Windsor Castle (official country residence of the King)
 Palace of Holyroodhouse (official residence of the King in Scotland)
 Hillsborough Castle (official residence of the King in Northern Ireland when in the province, otherwise, the official residence of the Secretary of State for Northern Ireland)
 Clarence House (official London residence of the King and the Queen Consort while renovations to Buckingham Palace are ongoing; previously official residence of Queen Elizabeth the Queen Mother)
 Kensington Palace (London residence of the Duke and Duchess of Gloucester, the Duke and Duchess of Kent, the Prince and Princess of Wales and their family)
 St James's Palace (seat of the Royal Court and senior Palace of the Sovereign, London residence of the Princess Royal and Sir Timothy Laurence, Princess Alexandra, and Princess Beatrice and Edoardo Mapelli Mozzi)
 Bagshot Park (official country residence of the Duke and Duchess of Edinburgh)
 10 Downing Street (London residence of the Prime Minister, in their capacity as First Lord of the Treasury)
 11 Downing Street (official residence of the Chancellor of the Exchequer, in their capacity as Second Lord of the Treasury)
 12 Downing Street (official residence of the Government Chief Whip but currently houses the Offices of the Prime Minister)
 Chequers (Country residence of the Prime Minister)
 Carlton Gardens, St. James's (No. 1 is the official residence of the Foreign Secretary and No. 2 houses the Privy Council Office)
 Admiralty House (three ministerial flats for use by Ministers of the Crown)
 Chevening House (country residence of a Minister of the Crown nominated by the Prime Minister, which is by custom given to the Foreign Secretary)
 Dorneywood (country residence of a Minister of the Crown nominated by the Prime Minister, which is by custom given to the Chancellor of the Exchequer)
 Palace of Westminster (grand state apartments for the Lord Speaker of the House of Lords, Speaker of the House of Commons, and the Lord Chancellor)
 Bute House (Official residence of the First Minister of Scotland)

Former
 Bridewell Palace (King, formerly; demolished)
 Carlton House, London (Prince, formerly; demolished)
 Cumberland House (Prince, formerly; demolished)
 Edinburgh Castle (King, formerly; kept as museum, barracks, vault, and venue for state receptions)
 Eltham Palace (King, formerly; Great Hall kept as museum)
 Falkland Palace (King, formerly; kept as museum)
 Hampton Court Palace (King, formerly; kept as museum)
 Kew Palace (Queen, formerly; kept as museum)
 Linlithgow Palace (King, formerly; damaged in fire (1746), kept as museum)
 Marlborough House (Queen, formerly; kept for headquarters for Commonwealth Secretariat)
 Nonsuch Palace (King, formerly; demolished)
 Palace of Placentia (King, formerly; demolished)
 Queen's House (Queen, formerly; kept as museum)
 Richmond Palace (King, formerly; demolished)
 Tower of London (King, formerly; kept as museum, barracks and vault)
 Palace of Westminster (King, formerly; kept as annex to the Houses of Parliament)
 Palace of Whitehall (King; destroyed in fire)

Local
 Mansion House (official residence of the Lord Mayor of London)
 Tulliallan Castle (official residence of the Chief Constable of the Police Service of Scotland)

Religious
 Lambeth Palace (official London residence of the Archbishop of Canterbury)
 Old Palace, Canterbury (official residence of the Archbishop of Canterbury in Canterbury)
 Bishopthorpe Palace (official residence of the Archbishop of York)
 Number 2 Rothesay Terrace (official residence of the Moderator of the General Assembly of the Church of Scotland)

Territorial
 Anguilla: Government House (official residence of the governor)
 Bermuda: Government House (official residence of the governor)
 British Virgin Islands: Government House (official residence of the governor)
 Cayman Islands: Government House (official residence of the governor)
 Falkland Islands: Government House (official residence of the governor)
 Gibraltar: The Convent (official residence of the governor) 6 Convent Place (official residence of the chief minister)
 Guernsey: Government House (official residence of the lieutenant governor)
 Jersey: Government House (official residence of the lieutenant governor)
 Isle of Man: Government House (official residence of the lieutenant governor)
 Montserrat: Government House (official residence of the governor)
 Pitcairn Islands: Government House (official residence of the governor)
 Saint Helena: Plantation House (official residence of the governor) The Castle (former official residence of the governor, now used as the governor's office)
 Turks and Caicos Islands: Government House (official residence of the governor)

United States

White House (President)
Camp David (President, retreat)
Number One Observatory Circle (Vice President)
Blair House (state guest house)
Presidential Townhouse (guest house for former Presidents)
Trowbridge House (currently being renovated to replace the Presidential Townhouse)
Quarters Six (Chairman of the Joint Chiefs of Staff)
Quarters One (Chief of Staff of the United States Army)
Quarters Seven / Air House (Chief of Staff of the United States Air Force)
Quarters A / Tingey House (Chief of Naval Operations)
Historic Home of the Commandants (Commandant of the Marine Corps)
50 United Nations Plaza 37th floor penthouse (Ambassador to the United Nations)

State

Alabama:Governor's MansionPresident's Mansion (President of the University of Alabama)
Alaska:Governor's Mansion
Arizona:none
Arkansas:Governor's Mansion
California:Governor's MansionBlake House (President of the University of California)University House (most common name for official residences of the chancellor of each individual University of California campus) University House, Berkeley (Chancellor of the University of California, Berkeley)
Colorado:Governor's Mansion
Connecticut:Governor's Mansion
Delaware:Woodburn
Florida:Governor's Mansion
Georgia:Governor's Mansion
Hawaii:Washington Place (Queen then Governor, formerly kept as museum)ʻIolani Palace (Queen, formerly kept for official government functions)Hulihee Palace (Queen, formerly retained as museum) College Hill (University of Hawaii President)
Idaho:none 
Illinois:Executive Mansion (Governor)Supreme Court Justices' apartmentsUniversity of Illinois at Chicago Chancellor's ResidencePresident's House, home of the University of Illinois' President
Indiana:Governor's Mansion
Iowa:Terrace Hill
Kansas:Cedar Crest
Kentucky:Governor's MansionOld Governor's Mansion (now official residence of the lieutenant governor)Maxwell Place (President of the University of Kentucky)Amelia Place (President of the University of Louisville)
Louisiana:Governor's Mansion
Maine:Blaine House
Maryland:Government HouseJennings House (from 1777–1870)
Massachusetts:none
Michigan:Governor's Residence, LansingGovernor's Summer Residence, Mackinac Island
Minnesota:Governor's Residence Eastcliff (President of the University of Minnesota)
Mississippi:Governor's Residence
Missouri:Governor's Mansion
Montana:Governor's Mansion
Nebraska:Governor's Mansion
Nevada:Governor's Mansion
New Hampshire:Bridges House
New Jersey:DrumthwacketGovernor's Ocean Residence (Summer Residence) President's House (Official Residence of the Rutgers University President)
New Mexico:Governor's Mansion
New York:Executive Mansion
North Carolina:Executive Mansion Western Residence (Mountain Retreat)
North Dakota:Governor's Mansion
Ohio:Governor's Mansion
Oklahoma:Governor's Mansion
Oregon:Stiff-Jarman House (prior to 1988)Mahonia HallMcMorran House (University of Oregon President)
Pennsylvania:Governor's Mansion
Rhode Island:none
South Carolina:Governor's Mansion
South Dakota:Governor's Mansion
Tennessee:Governor's Mansion
Texas:Governor's MansionTexas Speaker's Apartment (at Texas State Capitol)Texas Lieutenant Governor's Apartment (prior to 1983 fire) (at Texas State Capitol)
Utah:Governor's Mansion
Vermont:The Pavilion
Virginia:Executive MansionPresident's House (President of the College of William & Mary)
Carr's Hill (President of The University of Virginia)
Washington:Governor's MansionHill-Crest (President of the University of Washington)
West Virginia:Executive Mansion
Wisconsin:Governor's MansionOlin House (Chancellor of the University of Wisconsin – Madison) Chancellor's Residence (Chancellor of the University of Wisconsin – Milwaukee)
Wyoming:Governor's Mansion

Territorial
Puerto Rico
 La Fortaleza (Governor's Mansion)
 Playa El Convento (Governor's Beach Retreat)
Guam
 Government House (Governor)

Local

Note that some mayors in cities with an official mayor's residence choose instead to reside at their private residence, using the official residence for official functions only. This has occurred in the 21st century in Detroit and New York City, although  the mayors of both cities live in the official residences. In the case of Denver, no mayor has ever lived in the official residence; the city instead makes it available to certain non-profit groups for special functions.

Denver, Colorado:Cableland
Detroit, Michigan:Manoogian Mansion
Los Angeles, California:Getty House
New York, New York:Gracie Mansion
Henry County, Ohio:Henry County Sheriff's Residence and Jail (former)

Other

This section is reserved for official residences maintained by private, nongovernmental institutions.

Kensington, California: Blake House (President of the University of California)
New Orleans, Louisiana: 2 Audubon Place (President of Tulane University)
New York, New York: President's House (President of Columbia University) 37 Washington Square West (President of New York University)
Salt Lake City, Utah:Beehive House (President of the Church of Jesus Christ of Latter-day Saints; former)

Uzbekistan
 Oqsaroy (President)
 Kuksaroy (President)

Vanuatu
 State House (President)

Vatican City

 Apostolic Palace (Pope)
 Castel Gandolfo (Pope, summer residence; now partly open to the public as a museum and garden)
 Domus Sanctae Marthae (Guest House,  now kept as Pope Francis's residence)
 Mater Ecclesiae (Pope Emeritus)

Former
 Lateran Palace (Pope, formerly; currently houses in part the Vicariate of Rome and the Pontifical Museum of Christian Antiquities)
 Palace of the Popes in Viterbo (Pope, formerly; part of the Museo del Colle del Duomo)
 Papal Palace, Orvieto (Pope, formerly; houses the Museo Opera del Duomo)
 Papal Palace, Perugia (Pope, formerly; destroyed by fire in 1534)
 Palace of the Popes in Anagni (Pope, formerly; part of the Museo bonifaciano e del Lazio meridionale
 Palais des Papes, Avignon (Pope, formerly; houses a convention centre and the archives of the département of Vaucluse).
 Castel Sant'Angelo (Pope, formerly; kept as Museo Nazionale di Castel Sant'Angelo)
 Palace of Castel Gandolfo (Pope, formerly; currently a museum)

Venezuela

 Palacio de Miraflores (President)
 La Casona (Presidential residence)
 La Guzmania (former Vacation Residence)

Vietnam

 Presidential Palace
 Government Office (Prime Minister)
 1A Hùng Vương, Ba Đình, Hà Nội General Secretary's Residence

Former
Ho Chi Minh's Stilt House, (Former residence of Ho Chi Minh) 
Reunification Palace (also known as Independence Palace, former residence of the President of South Vietnam)
Gia Long Palace
Imperial City, Huế (former residence of the Nguyen dynasty monarchs)
Imperial Citadel of Thang Long (located in Hanoi, former residence of Vietnamese dynasties)

Yemen
 Presidential Palace

Zambia
 State House (President)

Zimbabwe
 State House (President)

International organizations

United Nations
 3 Sutton Place, Manhattan, New York City  (residence of the Secretary-General of the United Nations)

See also
 Air transports of heads of state and government
 Castle
 List of palaces
 Palace
 Presidential palace

Footnotes

 
Lists of government buildings